Hebbville may refer to a community in North America:

Hebbville, Nova Scotia, Canada
Hebbville, Maryland, United States